Mineichi Iwanaga (岩永峯一 Iwanaga Mineichi, born  September 5, 1941) is a Japanese politician.

Born in Koka, Shiga Prefecture, Iwanaga attended Koka Senior High School and graduated from the law faculty of Chuo University.

After serving as a town council member in Shiga, Iwanaga was elected to the House of Representatives in 1996, representing the fourth district of Shiga. He joined the Kato faction of the Liberal Democratic Party, but later switched to the Horiuchi faction. He became Vice Minister of Agriculture under the first Koizumi cabinet.

On August 11, 2005, Iwanaga became Minister of Agriculture following the resignation of Yoshinobu Shimamura.

References

1941 births
Living people
People from Shiga Prefecture
Chuo University alumni
Members of the House of Representatives (Japan)
Government ministers of Japan
Agriculture in Japan
Liberal Democratic Party (Japan) politicians
21st-century Japanese politicians